Ostrzeszów  is a town in central Poland, in Greater Poland Voivodeship. It is the capital of Ostrzeszów County. The population in 2006 was 14,536 inhabitants.

Attractions in the town include the surrounding forests, an attractive town square, and the Norwegian POW Museum.

Also, a popular guitarist, Adam Fulara was born in Ostrzeszów.

History
The settlement of Ostrzeszów predates the advent of Christianity in Poland in 966. In antiquity, the Amber Road ran through the area. Ostrzeszów acquired town privileges sometime between 1261 and 1283, when it first appears in historical records. In the 14th century, Polish King Casimir III the Great erected a castle, defensive town walls and the Gothic church of the Assumption of Mary. The town's coat of arms was probably granted by Casimir's successor Louis the Hungarian. It contains the head of the crowned white eagle from the coat of arms of Poland. Ostrzeszów was a Polish royal town and county seat within the Sieradz Voivodeship in the Greater Poland Province of the Polish Crown. During the 16th to 18th centuries it was the seat of district courts. Ostrzeszów prospered in the early modern era, multiple craft guilds were founded and trade flourished until the Swedes destroyed the castle and the town in 1656 during the Swedish invasion of Poland (Deluge). The town declined as a result.

It was annexed by Prussia in the Second Partition of Poland in 1793. In 1807 it was regained by Poles and included within the short-lived Duchy of Warsaw, in 1815 it was reannexed by Prussia, and from 1871 to 1918 it was part of Germany, however, in the early 20th century its population was still predominantly Polish. Under Prussian and German rule, the eagle in the coat of arms was changed to the black eagle from the coat of arms of Prussia. In 1914, a Polish scout troop was established in the town. After World War I, in November 1918, Poland regained independence and the Greater Poland Uprising broke out, which goal was to reintegrate the town and region with the reborn Polish state. Local Poles made secret preparations for the uprising in November and December 1918. Polish insurgents liberated the town on January 1, 1919, and a local insurgent unit marched out of the town on January 7 to fight in other areas. In interwar Poland, the town's historic Polish coat of arms was restored.
 
During the German invasion of Poland, which started World War II, the Einsatzgruppe III entered the town on September 6–7, 1939, to commit various crimes against Poles. During the subsequent German occupation it was annexed directly to Nazi Germany, and was administered within the newly formed province of Reichsgau Wartheland. Most of the Polish inhabitants were expelled. Germany operated the Stalag XXI-A prisoner-of-war camp in various buildings throughout the town from September 1939. Initially 12,000 Polish prisoners of war and civilians were imprisoned in the camp. Also Franciscans from Niepokalanów were held there, including Maximilian Kolbe, who was later killed in the Auschwitz concentration camp and is now considered a saint of the Catholic Church. From 1940 Polish, French and English POWs were held in the camp and in 1942 also Yugoslavs. In 1943 the camp was converted to Oflag XXI-C for 1,130 Norwegian officers, but also for Dutch, Italian, Serbian and Soviet POWs. The Germans also operated a Nazi prison in the town from 1942 to 1944. Shortly before retreating, on January 20, 1945, the Germans carried out a massacre of 14 Poles in the town, and the next day Soviet forces captured the town, which was then restored to Poland.

Sports
It competes in the lower leagues.

Cuisine
The officially protected traditional foods originating from Ostrzeszów (as designated by the Ministry of Agriculture and Rural Development of Poland) are:
 kiełbasa wiejska ostrzeszowska, a local type of kiełbasa, prepared using traditional non-industrial methods, smoked with beech wood.
 Ostrzeszów pork leg (udziec wieprzowy ostrzeszowski), a locally popular roast leg, prepared using traditional non-industrial methods, a staple Easter dish in the town and its surroundings.
 wędzonka ostrzeszowska, a type of Polish smoked pork meat, prepared using traditional non-industrial methods, also a popular traditional Christmas and Easter dish in the town.
 Ostrzeszów oat goose (gęś owsiana ostrzeszowska), a local type of roasted goose, traditional dish of Ostrzeszów and the Greater Poland region.

Gallery

References

External links
 Official town webpage
 Norwegian POW camp

Cities and towns in Greater Poland Voivodeship
Ostrzeszów County
Sieradz Voivodeship (1339–1793)
Poznań Voivodeship (1921–1939)